Inverclyde is a council area (and former district) of Scotland. It may also refer to:
 Inverclyde (UK Parliament constituency) — a constituency represented in the [House of Commons of the United Kingdom]
 Greenock and Inverclyde (UK Parliament constituency) — predecessor constituency of the above
 Renfrew West and Inverclyde (UK Parliament constituency) — predecessor constituency of part of the above
 Greenock and Inverclyde (Scottish Parliament constituency)  — constituency represented in the Scottish Parliament
 Inverclyde Line — a railway branch line serving the southern bank of the River Clyde, Scotland
 Inverclyde National Sports Training Centre — an elite sports training facility in Largs, North Ayrshire operated by Sportscotland
 Inverclyde Royal Hospital, a district general hospital in Greenock
 Baron Inverclyde — an extinct barony in the Peerage of the United Kingdom